was a town located in Ena District, Gifu Prefecture, Japan.

As of 2003, the town had an estimated population of 5,372 and a density of 156.34 persons per km². The total area was 34.36 km².

On October 25, 2004, Iwamura, along with the towns of Akechi, Kamiyahagi and Yamaoka, and the village of Kushihara (all from Ena District), was merged into the expanded city of Ena, and no longer exists as an independent municipality.

Iwamura Castle is located in Iwamura.

Notes

External links
 Official website of Ena 

Dissolved municipalities of Gifu Prefecture
Populated places disestablished in 2004
Ena, Gifu

2004 disestablishments in Japan